Florian Camathias (23 March 1924 – 10 October 1965) was a Swiss professional Grand Prix motorcycle and sidecar racer.

Born in Wittenbach, St. Gallen in the canton of St. Gallen in Switzerland, Camathias owned a garage Veytaux, near Montreux.

Race career 
He began his motorcycle racing career in 1945. Camathias placed fifth in the World Sidecar Championship in 1956. In 1957, he entered his first Isle of Man TT, finishing in ninth place in the Lightweight 250 event on an NSU solo motorcycle, and in third place in the Sidecar TT driving a BMW.

Camathias won his first Grand Prix victory in the 1958 Dutch TT at Assen. He also finished as runner-up position in the British Sidecar Championship. Repeating the achievements in 1959, he was Swiss and British Champion in 1960 and once again finished fifth in the World Championship.

Camathias crashed in the 1962 Sidecar TT, a race won by English racer Chris Vincent with a BSA-engined outfit. Camathias won his one and only TT at the 1963 races.

Camathias was a renowned engine builder associated with the desirable BMW RS54 Rennsport overhead camshaft competition engine, and began an association with English sidecar racer Colin Seeley, who used Camathias' engine for the 1964 Sidecar TT, placing third on a machine he dubbed as FCSB — Florian Camathias Special 'B''',  whilst Camathias finished 15th in the same race using a Gilera engine.

Death
He died after crashing during a race at Brands Hatch, Kent, England, on 10 October 1965.England and Wales death records Retrieved 12 December 2015 Camathias' passenger, Franz Ducret, was injured but recovered in West Hill Hospital, Dartford, Kent.

An inquest, presided over by Coroner for North Kent, Col. W.H. Harris, found that the crash was caused by welding failure where a front-fork tube had broken-away, and recorded a verdict of misadventure. Around 1,000 people attended the funeral with many from the motorcycle and car racing fraternity.

Legacy
A European sidecar classic racing series was established named Camathias Cup Championship'' with classes for two engine capacities, under 750 cc and over 750 cc, with winners decided on the overall highest points score in each class. In 2015, 45 teams participated achieving full grids in five countries, including a 2-race short road-course event on the Billown Circuit at the Pre-TT races, part the Isle of Man race festival.

Family connections
Florian was the uncle to Romeo Camathias, a car racer born in 1947, whose son Joël Camathias is also a car racer.

References

External links
Florian Camathias Family connection at Joël Camathias' website
Camathias Cup homepage

1924 births
1965 deaths
Sportspeople from the canton of St. Gallen
Swiss motorcycle racers
Sidecar racers
250cc World Championship riders
Isle of Man TT riders
Motorcycle racers who died while racing
Sport deaths in England